The 2023 Judo Grand Slam Tashkent was held at the Yunusobod Sport Complex in Tashkent, Uzbekistan from 3 to 5 March 2023 as part of the IJF World Tour and during the 2024 Summer Olympics qualification period.

Medal summary

Men's events

Women's events

Source results:

Medal table

Prize money
The sums written are per medalist, bringing the total prizes awarded to €154,000.

References

External links
 

2023 Judo Grand Slam
2023 IJF World Tour
Judo
Grand Slam 2023
Judo
Judo